Ben Jerome Davis (born December 26, 1972) is an American former professional basketball player who played with the NBA's Phoenix Suns and New York Knicks. Davis attended Oak Hill Academy, University of Kansas, the University of Florida, Hutchinson Community College, and the University of Arizona and played collegiately at all, except for Florida. In his one season at Hutchinson in 1994, Davis led team to the NJCAA championship.

Davis was selected 43rd overall in the 1996 NBA Draft by the Phoenix Suns but played in the CBA in 1996–97 instead. As well as playing with the Suns and the New York Knicks during his short NBA career, Davis was also signed by the Miami Heat and Houston Rockets, but never played a game for either.

Davis last played in 2009 for Lechugueros de León in Mexico.

Notes

External links
NBA.com official player profile
College & NBA stats @ basketballreference.com

1972 births
Living people
African-American basketball players
American expatriate basketball people in Greece
American expatriate basketball people in Italy
American expatriate basketball people in Mexico
American expatriate basketball people in Portugal
American expatriate basketball people in Spain
American expatriate basketball people in Uruguay
American expatriate basketball people in Venezuela
American men's basketball players
Arizona Wildcats men's basketball players
Basketball players from Florida
Cantabria Baloncesto players
Capitanes de Arecibo players
Grand Rapids Hoops players
Greek Basket League players
Harlem Globetrotters players
Idaho Stampede (CBA) players
Hutchinson Blue Dragons men's basketball players
Kansas Jayhawks men's basketball players
Lechugueros de León players
Liga ACB players
Makedonikos B.C. players
McDonald's High School All-Americans
New York Knicks players
Parade High School All-Americans (boys' basketball)
People from Vero Beach, Florida
Phoenix Suns draft picks
Phoenix Suns players
Power forwards (basketball)
Roseto Sharks players
S.L. Benfica basketball players
Saski Baskonia players
Trotamundos B.B.C. players
American expatriate basketball people in the Philippines
Barangay Ginebra San Miguel players
Philippine Basketball Association imports
21st-century African-American sportspeople
20th-century African-American sportspeople